Alexander Alexandrovich Zhilkin (born August 26, 1959) is a Russian politician who served as the Governor of Astrakhan Oblast between 2004 and 2018. He became acting governor in August 2004, when governor Anatoly Guzhvin, who had been the leader of the oblast for over a decade, died. Zhilkin was elected governor as a candidate of the United Russia party in 2004, receiving 65% of the vote; an overall majority. He was the first deputy before he became the governor. On 26 October 2018, he resigned and was replaced by Sergey Morozov

Awards 
 Order For Merit to the Fatherland 4th (2008)
 Order of Honour (2003) 
 Order of Friendship (1998)

References

External links
 Official website of Alexander Zhilkin. Biography 
 Official website of Astrakhan Oblast. Biography of Alexander Zhilkin 

1959 births
Living people
Governors of Astrakhan Oblast
United Russia politicians
21st-century Russian politicians
Recipients of the Order of Honour (Russia)